Barrhead Airport,  is located  southwest of Barrhead, Alberta, Canada.

References

External links
Page about this airport on COPA's Places to Fly airport directory

Registered aerodromes in Alberta
Barrhead, Alberta